Rote Traun is a river of Bavaria, Germany. It is formed at the confluence of the Falkenseebach and the Großwaldbach in Inzell. At its confluence with the Weiße Traun near Siegsdorf, the Traun is formed.

See also
List of rivers of Bavaria

References

Rivers of Bavaria
Rivers of Germany